Ben-Julian Harrington  is a British senior police officer who has served as the Chief Constable of Essex Police since October 2018. He started his policing career with the Metropolitan Police Service in 1990, where he worked in Chingford and Walthamstow. He is married to another Metropolitan police officer and has two daughters . Prior to becoming Chief Constable, Harrington was the Temporary Deputy Chief Constable of Essex Police.

He was awarded the Queen's Police Medal (QPM) in the 2022 New Year Honours.

Honours
<div class="center">

References

 

 
 

Living people
British Chief Constables
Metropolitan Police officers
Year of birth missing (living people)
English recipients of the Queen's Police Medal
Chief Constables of Essex Police